Brockton may refer to:

Canada
 Brockton (electoral district), Canada
 Brockton, Ontario, Canada
 Brockton Point, a point and attached peninsula in Vancouver
 Brockton Point Lighthouse, in Stanley Park, Vancouver, British Columbia
 Brockton Village, a neighbourhood within the City of Toronto, Canada

U.S.
 Brockton, Georgia
 Brockton, Massachusetts
 Brockton (MBTA station), in Brockton, Massachusetts
 Brockton, Montana
 Brockton, Pennsylvania

Other
 Brockton, Shropshire, England
 Brockton Station (Antarctica)

See also
Brocton (disambiguation)